Bonds of Love is a 1919 American silent romantic drama film directed by Reginald Barker and starring Pauline Frederick. It is based on the 1906 Arthur Wing Pinero play His House in Order. Distributed by Goldwyn Pictures, the film is now considered lost.

Plot 
Una Sayre, a governess in widower Daniel Cabot's home, saves his son, young Jimmy Cabot, from drowning. Through her attention to the child, she wins the love of her employer despite the plotting of Lucy and Harry Beekman, his late wife's brother and sister. When Una discovers a love letter written by a man whom the first wife was seeing, she visits him and demands that he return all of her letters. Lucy and Harry Beekman use this meeting to cast suspicions on Una's reputation, but Cabot eventually discovers that Una was acting in his own interest. He finally overcomes his devotion to the memory of his dead wife, and throws her greedy relatives out.

Cast
Pauline Frederick as Una Sayre
Percy Standing as Daniel Cabot
Betty Schade as Lucy Beekman
Leslie Stuart as Harry Beekman
Charles Clary as Barry Sullivan
Kate Lester as Mrs. Cunningham
Frankie Lee as Jimmy Cabot

See also
His House in Order (1920)
His House in Order (1928)
 List of lost films

References

External links

Bonds of Love coming attractions slide (Wayback Machine)
lobby poster

1919 films
1919 romantic drama films
American romantic drama films
American silent feature films
American black-and-white films
American films based on plays
Goldwyn Pictures films
Lost American films
1919 lost films
Lost comedy films
Lost romance films
Films directed by Reginald Barker
1910s American films
Silent romantic drama films
Silent American drama films